These are the winners of the 2003 Billboard Music Awards, an awards show based on chart performance, and number of downloads and total airplay. All winners are in bold. Beyoncé won 5 awards out of 6 nominations, while R Kelly and 50 Cent both won 4 awards out of 5 nominations.

Winners and nominees

Artist of the year
50 Cent
R. Kelly
Sean Paul
Justin Timberlake

R&B artist of the year
50 Cent
Aaliyah
Jay Z
R. Kelly

Rap artist of the year
50 Cent
Chingy
Fabolous
Sean Paul

Country artist of the year
Shania Twain
Dixie Chicks
Toby Keith
Tim McGraw

Country album of the year
Up!, Shania Twain
Home, Dixie Chicks
Tim McGraw and the Dancehall Doctors, Tim McGraw
Unleashed, Toby Keith

Rock artist of the year
Audioslave
3 Doors Down
Disturbed
Trapt

Rock single of the year
Headstrong, Trapt
Seven Nation Army, The White Stripes
Like a Stone, Audioslave
Send the Pain Below, Chevelle

Hot 100 artist duo/group of the year
3 Doors Down
Dixie Chicks
Matchbox Twenty
Santana

R&B/Hip-Hop group of the year
Lil Jon & The East Side Boyz
B2K
Dru Hill
Floetry

Female new artist of the year
Beyoncé

Century Award
Sting

Modern rock artist of the year
Audioslave
Linkin Park
Foo Fighters
Chevelle

New R&B/Hip-Hop artist of the year
Beyoncé
Chingy
Floetry
Heather Headley

Top digital song of the year
Hey Ya!, Outkast
Clocks, Coldplay
Where Is the Love?, The Black Eyed Peas
Crazy in Love, Beyoncé feat. Jay Z

Hot 100 producer of the year
R. Kelly
The Neptunes
Timbaland
Lenky

Hot 100 songwriter of the year
R. Kelly

R&B/Hip-Hop producer of the year
R. Kelly

Country album artist of the year
Shania Twain
Dixie Chicks
Toby Keith
Tim McGraw

Independent album Artist of the year
Lil Jon & The East Side Boyz

New group artist of the year
Evanescence

Independent album of the year
 Kings of Crunk, Lil Jon & The East Side Boyz

Hot 100 Award for Most Weeks at No. 1
Crazy in Love, Beyoncé feat. Jay Z
Baby Boy, Beyoncé feat. Sean Paul

Rhythmic Top 40 title of the yearRight Thurr, Chingy
Get Low, Lil Jon & The East Side Boyz
In da Club, 50 Cent
Shake Ya Tailfeather, Murphy Lee, P. Diddy, and Nelly

New male R&B artist of the yearChingyFemale Hot 100 artist of the yearBeyoncéAaliyah
Christina Aguilera
Ashanti

No. 1 classical crossover artist of the yearJosh GrobanNo. 1 classical crossover album of the yearCloserSoundtrack single of the yearBring Me to LifeMainstream Top 40 single of the yearWhere Is the Love?, The Black Eyed Peas
I'm with You, Avril Lavigne
Bring Me to Life, Evanescence feat. Paul McCoy
Beautiful, Christina Aguilera

Top-selling single of the yearBridge Over Troubled Water and This Is The Night, Clay Aiken
God Bless the U.S.A., American Idol 2 Finalists
Picture, Kid Rock feat. Allison Moorer
Flying Without Wings, Ruben Studdard

Top Billboard 200 Album of the yearGet Rich or Die Tryin', 50 CentHome, Dixie Chicks
Come Away With Me, Norah Jones
Up!, Shania Twain

R&B Songwriter of the yearR. Kelly'''
Chad Hugo
Timbaland
Pharrell Williams

References

2003
Billboard awards
2003 music awards
2003 in American music
MGM Grand Garden Arena